Pike State Forest is a state forest in the state of Ohio.

History
In 1924 the acquisition for the lands of the forest began, with the objective of restoring damaged woodland affected by fire and human interference to a form of protection. In the 1930s the Civilian Conservation Corps and the Division of Forestry undertook much of the restoration work.

Landscape and resources
Pike State Forest, whilst a protected area, offers a wide range of recreational activities, and the area is open to the public from April 1 to November 30 every year. It has  of trails for hiking and horse riding,  of trail open to motorcycles and off-road all-terrain vehicles. In season, Pike State Forest is also open to public hunting and fishing. Anderson Lake within the forest is a popular spot for fishing.

References

Ohio state forests
Protected areas established in 1924
Civilian Conservation Corps in Ohio
Protected areas of Pike County, Ohio
Protected areas of Highland County, Ohio